The Labour Campaign for Trans Rights (LCTR) is a British pressure group within the Labour Party, founded in February 2020.

During a leadership election that month, the group issued a 12-point programme which called for the expulsion of Labour members who belong to what they described as hate groups, or which expressed what they said were bigoted, transphobic views. Two of the groups they described as hate groups were Woman's Place UK and the LGB Alliance, which have been described by the LCTR as "trans-exclusionist". This was criticised by Mark Serwotka, General Secretary of the Public and Commercial Services Union (PCS), and led to the #expelme tag among some Labour members.

The pledge was supported by candidates Rebecca Long-Bailey and Lisa Nandy, but not by Keir Starmer, who later became leader of the party. Starmer endorsed a "less contentious 10-point pledge" from LGBT+ Labour.

References

2020 establishments in the United Kingdom
Labour Party (UK) socialist societies
LGBT affiliate organizations of political parties
LGBT political advocacy groups in the United Kingdom
Transgender organisations in the United Kingdom